Sphallenopsis pilosovittata is a species of beetle in the family Cerambycidae, the only species in the genus Sphallenopsis.

References

Cerambycini